Ziyo Tembo (born 30 June 1985) is a Zambian footballer who plays as a defender for the Zambia national football team.

Club career

On 26 July 2018, Al-Shoulla has signed  Tembo for one seasons from Zanaco F.C.

References

External links

1985 births
Living people
Zambian footballers
Zambian expatriate footballers
Zambia international footballers
Association football defenders
Saudi First Division League players
Al-Shoulla FC players
Zanaco F.C. players
Zambian expatriate sportspeople in Saudi Arabia
Expatriate footballers in Saudi Arabia
Zambia A' international footballers
2018 African Nations Championship players